The Anti-Monopoly Committee of Ukraine (AMK) is the supreme competition regulator in Ukraine. It is a state authority with special status, aimed at providing the state protection to competition in the field of entrepreneurial activity.

Overview
The Antimonopoly Committee of Ukraine carries out its activities on the grounds of the legislative acts concerning economic competition protection, such as the Laws of Ukraine “On economic competition protection”, “On the Antimonopoly Committee of Ukraine”, and “On protection from unfair competition”.

The committee consists of the chairman and 10 commissioners, out of which there are two first deputies and three other deputies. The activities of the Antimonopoly Committee of Ukraine are under the control of the president of Ukraine; The committee is accountable to the Supreme Council of Ukraine. The president in consent with the Supreme Council of Ukraine designates and dismisses from the appointment the chairman of the Antimonopoly Committee of Ukraine. First deputies and deputies of the chairman of the Antimonopoly Committee of Ukraine are to be designated and dismissed from their appointments by the president of Ukraine on the proposal of the prime minister. The proposal is made on the grounds of the suggestions of the chairman of the Antimonopoly Committee of Ukraine.

In every region of Ukraine, including the cities of Kyiv and Sevastopol, territorial offices of the Antimonopoly Committee of Ukraine are to be created. The above-mentioned offices are legal entities which carry out the tasks of the Antimonopoly Committee on the regional level.

Within the framework of its procuration the committee supervises the activities of enterprises of all types of ownership, state and local authorities, activities of foreign entrepreneurs in Ukraine as well. The committee is entitled to make decisions concerning abatement of the competition legislation breach, which are obligatory for enterprises and state authorities, to allow or prohibit concerted actions in the market, to impose fines or apply other sanctions with respect to the breakers of the rules of fair competition. In 2020, the Anti-Monopoly Committee demanded that its powers be expanded to give the agency the ability to have a say in the appeal of public procurement.

Composition

Market Studies Department
 Division for Infrastructure, Housing, and Utilities
 Office of Transportation Markets
 Office of Communication, Housing, and Utilities Markets
 Division for Energy Markets
 Office of Oil Products Market
 Office of Gas and Energy
 Division for Financial and Non-Production Markets
 Office of Financial Markets
 Office of Non-Production Markets
 Office of Medical Services and Retail Markets
 Division for Industrial Markets
 Office of Agro-Industrial Markets
 Office of Industrial Markets

Investigations Department
 Office of Investigations of Monopoly Abuse and Restrictive Practices
 Office of Investigations of horizontally coordinated actions
 Office of Investigation of Unfair Competition
 Office of Investigations of certain types of anti-competitive coordinated actions

Legal Department

Department of Operations and Support
 Division of Human Resources and coordination of territorial offices
 Division of Strategic Analysis, Planning, and Methodology
 Division of the Committee Affairs
 Division of Procurement, Administration, and IT Support
 Division of Control over Concentration and Coordinated Actions
 Division on issues of Decision Appeals in Government Procurement
 Office of Accounting and Financial Planning
 Office of International Cooperation
 Office of public relations and interaction with mass media and access to public information
 Safety sector
 Control-Revision Sector
 Sector of control over the executions of orders of higher authorities
 Regional offices

Public Council

Chairmen
 1992 - 2001—Oleksandr Zavada
 2001 - 2008—Oleksiy Kostusyev
 2008 - 2010—Oleksandr Melnychenko (acting)
 2010 - 2010—Oleksiy Kostusyev
 2010–2014—Vasyl Tsushko
 2014 - 2015—Mykola Barash (acting)
 2015–2020—Yuriy Terentyev
 2020 – present—Olha Pishchanska

References

External links
 Official website

Anti-Monopoly Committee of Ukraine
Competition regulators
Consumer organizations in Ukraine
Regulation in Ukraine